The 17th Annual GMA Dove Awards were held on 1986 recognizing accomplishments of musicians for the year 1985. The show was held in Nashville, Tennessee.

Award recipients
Song of the Year
"Via Dolorosa"; Billy Sprague, Niles Borop; Meadowgreen Music, Word Music (ASCAP)
Songwriter of the Year
Gloria Gaither
Male Vocalist of the Year
Larnelle Harris
Female Vocalist of the Year
Sandi Patti
Artist of the Year
Amy Grant
Southern Gospel Album of the Year
Excited; The Hemphills; Wayne Hilton, Trent Hemphill; HeartWarming
Inspirational Album of the Year
I've Just Seen Jesus; Larnelle Harris; Greg Nelson; Impact
Pop/Contemporary Album of the Year
Medals; Russ Taff; Jack Joseph Puig, Russ Taff; Myrrh Records
Contemporary Gospel Album of the Year
Let My People Go; The Winans; Marvin Winans; Qwest/Warner Bros.
Traditional Gospel Album of the Year
Celebration; Shirley Caesar; Dave Lehman, Shirley Caesar, David Lehman; Rejoice
Instrumentalist
Dino Kartsonakis
Praise and Worship Album of the Year
I've Just Seen Jesus; Bill Gaither, Randy Vader; Gaither Music Records
Children's Music Album of the Year
Bullfrogs & Butterflies Part II; Tony Salerno; Birdwing
Musical Album
Come Celebrate Jesus; Neal Joseph, Don Marsh; Word
Recorded Music Packaging of the Year
Mark Tucker, Thomas Ryan, Kent Hunter Unguarded; Amy Grant
Album by a Secular Artist
No More Night; Glen Campbell; Glen Campbell, Ken Harding; Word

External links
 https://doveawards.com/awards/past-winners/

GMA Dove Awards
1986 music awards
1986 in American music
1986 in Tennessee
GMA